Route 301 is an  provincial highway located in the Outaouais region in western Quebec. The route serves as a direct connection between the Pontiac region and the Upper Gatineau region. The 82-kilometer route runs from the end of Ontario Highway 653 near Portage-du-Fort and joins Route 148 for a  stretch up to Campbell's Bay where it continues eastward and ends in Kazabazua at the junction of Route 105.

Municipalities along Highway 301
 Portage-du-Fort
 Bryson
 Litchfield
 Campbell's Bay
 Thorne
 Otter Lake
 Alleyn-et-Cawood
 Kazabazua

Major intersections

See also
 List of Quebec provincial highways

References

External links 
 Provincial Route Map (Courtesy of the Quebec Ministry of Transportation) 
 Route 301 on Google Maps

301
Roads in Outaouais